Robin Hood: Defender of the Crown is a video game loosely based on the legend of Robin Hood and remake of Cinemaware's previous game Defender of the Crown, released for PlayStation 2, Windows, Xbox, and mobile phones.

Plot
It is a time of great unrest in England. With King Richard the Lionheart held for ransom, the evil Prince John seizes the throne, and declares himself the King of England. The entire nation soon falls into civil war as greedy nobles war amongst themselves and Prince John sends forth armies to shackle the country under his unjust rule.

In this time of lawlessness, only an outlaw can lead the people to freedom. One man, the embodiment of true honor, vows to save his people and restore peace to the land. This man is known as Robin Hood. From the small-scale skirmishes with the Sheriff of Nottingham in Sherwood Forest, Robin finds himself drawn into the larger battlefields of England, and the hero of the poor must become the savior of an entire nation.

Gameplay

Robin Hood is a blend of role-playing and turn-based strategy combined with action sequences.

As Robin Hood, the player must:
Fund the war effort by lightening the purses of traveling merchants in archery ambushes. 
Lay siege to castles using mighty siege engines and Greek Fire. 
Joust in tournaments for fame, fortune and land. 
Conquer England's 38 territories by commanding troops on the battlefield and manage Robin's growing armies. 
Sword fight through battlements, catacombs and towers in search of treasure - or to rescue a damsel-in-distress.

The game also features:
Special events, multiple goals and non-linear gameplay. 
A story of action, drama, romance and adventure. 
Twenty minutes of rendered cutscenes and a full hour of recorded voice acting.
8 different alternate game endings depending on the player's actions through the game.

Reception

The PC, PlayStation 2 and Xbox versions received "mixed" reviews according to the review aggregation website Metacritic. IGN said, "With all the elements that come into play, Defender of the Crown is overly enjoyable — especially for fans of strategy titles who want to be able to pick up and play something without too much of a hassle."

References

External links 
 Official product page
 

2003 video games
Capcom games
Cinemaware games
Mobile games
PlayStation 2 games
Defender of the Crown
Turn-based strategy video games
Video game remakes
Video games developed in the United States
Video games scored by Troels Brun Folmann
Video games set in the Middle Ages
Windows games
Xbox games
Atomic Planet Entertainment games
Single-player video games
I-play games